Mistaya Canyon is a canyon in the western part of the Canadian  province of Alberta. It is formed by the Mistaya River. Tourists who are visiting Banff National Park often visit it because of its distinctive curvy canyon walls and because it is easy to access, being just off the Icefields Parkway.  The 0.5 km trail to the canyon is located at a large parking area on the west side of the Parkway, part way up the long hill south of the North Saskatchewan River.  There are actually two such parking areas on the hill; the Mistaya one is clearly marked by signs on the highway and at the beginning of the trail.  The trail is an easy walk in summer but too steep for wheelchairs. The canyon is deep and there are no railings.  The trail is icy in early spring.

Hikers will find that the Howse Pass Trail continues past the canyon. 

Banff National Park
Canyons and gorges of Canada